Batn-El-Hajar or Belly of Stones is a reach of approximately 160 km in length stretching from the Dal Cataract of the Nile downriver to the now under Lake Nubia submerged Second Cataract in present-day Sudan.

History
Batn-El-Hajar is a barren and granite-rich landscape limiting arable soil and, thus, sparsely inhabited. It was the traditional border between Upper Nubia and Lower Nubia. In this area are a number of important A-Group and Meroitics archeological sites.

References 

Nile
Nubia
Geography of Sudan
Archaeological sites in Sudan
History of Nubia